The Cluj metropolitan area is a metropolitan area in Cluj County, which includes Cluj-Napoca and 19 communes nearby: Aiton, Apahida, Baciu, Bonțida, Borșa, Căianu, Chinteni, Ciurila, Cojocna, Feleacu, Florești, Gilău, Gârbau, Jucu, Petreștii de Jos, Săvădisla, Sânpaul, Tureni, Vultureni. 

The population of the 20 administrative units totals 418,153 people, of whom 324,576 live in Cluj-Napoca.

Population 
According to the 2011 census, this is the population of each of the administrative units that comprise the Cluj Metropolitan Area:

History 
The Cluj Metropolitan Area was legally established in the fall of 2008 as an inter-community development association, having as founders the municipality of Cluj-Napoca, the Cluj County Council and 17 communes in the vicinity of Cluj. In 2009, the commune of Sânpaul joined the metropolitan area, and in 2016, the commune of Săvădisla joined in.

Objectives 
The objectives pursued by the Cluj Metropolitan Area Intercommunity Development Association are:

 Enhancing knowledge-based economic competitiveness; 
 The development and upgrading of transport infrastructure; 
 To protect and improve the quality of the environment; 
 Human resources development, employment growth and the fight against social exclusion; 
 The development of the rural economy and the increase of productivity in the agricultural sector;  
 Balanced participation to the socio-economic development process for all the administrative units of the Cluj Metropolitan Area.

Projects 
The Cluj Metropolitan Area, as a leader or partner, has carried out or runs a number of projects with European Union funding or from EEA and Norwegian Grants. They include: 

 “European Digital Citizens” (Eudigit)
 URBforDAN. Management and Use of Urban Foreres as Natural Heritage in Danube Cities
 The Lab Cluj. Metropolitan Laboratory for Social Innovation
 Pata 2. Replicable integrated interventions for inclusive housing and combating marginalisation in Cluj Metropolitan Area 
 Cluj Future of Work, „Informal Work” Work Package

References

Geography of Cluj County
Metropolitan areas of Romania